The New Orleans Bingo! Show is an interactive theatrical cabaret and musical band from New Orleans, Louisiana. The show features original music by New Orleans singer and songwriter Clint Maedgen who created the show in 2002. The show also features original short films, comedic skits and a live game of bingo played with the audience. The group toured with the Preservation Hall Jazz Band in 2007 and 2008.

The Bingo! Show  played at The Voodoo Experience held at City Park in New Orleans, Louisiana over Halloween weekend for several years. As of 2017, they last performed in 2014.

References

External links
Official site

Cabaret
American jazz ensembles from New Orleans
American funk musical groups
Rock music groups from Louisiana
Musical groups from New Orleans